Ivan Shaw is a Taiwanese-American actor who made his daytime debut in December 2002, playing young Henry Chin in the ABC daytime show All My Children.

Early life and education
Shaw moved from Taipei, Taiwan at age 4 to Upland, California where he grew up with his older brother, Eugene (also an aspiring actor), and grandparents. At one time, he attended Upland Chinese Presbyterian Church.

Shaw attended Upland High School and attended UCLA where he studied math, economics and computer science.

Career
Along the way, Shaw also became interested in acting. He played lead roles at New York City's off-Broadway Century Theatre's production of Savage Love and Shurin Studio's A Boy's Life, with critically acclaimed reviews.

Following a series of appearances on TV shows such as Haunted (as Tommy), CSI:NY (as Billy James), Charmed (as Attendant), The Closer (as Donnie), Monk (as a Rap Producer), The Mind of the Married Man (as Machiko), All My Children (as Henry Chin), General Hospital (as a Band Member), The Young and the Restless (as Alan), and Baywatch Hawaii, Shaw appeared as Adam Webster on the short-lived, controversial NBC show The Book of Daniel.

Shaw has also appeared in feature films such as Get Him to the Greek (as a Pinnacle Executive), L!fe Happens (as Ivan #2), The Truth About Angels (as JC), and Rush Hour 2 (as a Triad Gangster). He also appears as Tao in a short film directed by David Parker and Cole Schreiber (aka Sunday Paper) called "Mission Chinese" also starring Ron Yuan and Elaine Tan.

He also stars as the romantic lead opposite Kelly Hu in Bertha Bay-Sa Pan's feature film, Almost Perfect (2011), also starring Edison Chen. Tina Chen, Roger Rees and Christina Chang.

He has also Associate Produced a film entitled The Time Being starring Frank Langella, Wes Bentley and directed by Nenad Cicin-Sain, and which made its premiere at the 2012 Toronto International Film Festival. He has also written a short film entitled The Tip with Kelvin Yu, and directed by Tyler Brooks.

Selected filmography
Dear Edward as Steve
That Dirty Black Bag (2022) as Kurt
The Cleaning Lady (2022) as Marco de la Rosa
Nocturne (2020)
Insecure (2016) as Justin
 Mission Chinese (2012) as Tao
 Almost Perfect (2011) as Dwayne Sung
 Get Him to the Greek - Pinnacles Executive
 CSI: NY (2010) as Billy James
 The Young and the Restless (2008) as Alan
Monk (2007) as a Rap Producer
 The Book of Daniel (2006) as Adam Webster
The Closer (2006) as Donnie
The Division (2004) as Lee
 All My Children (2003) as Henry Chin
The Mind of the Married Man (2002) as Machiko
Charmed (2002) as Attendant
Haunted (2002) as Tommy
General Hospital (2002) as Band Member
 Rush Hour 2 (2001) as Triad Gangster (uncredited)

References

External links

Year of birth missing (living people)
Living people
21st-century American male actors
Male actors from California
American male film actors
American male actors of Chinese descent
American male television actors
Place of birth missing (living people)
People from Upland, California
Taiwanese emigrants to the United States
University of California, Los Angeles alumni
American male actors of Taiwanese descent